2012–2017 is the third studio album by American electronic music artist Nicolás Jaar, under the moniker A.A.L. (Against All Logic), later referred to only as Against All Logic. It was released on February 17, 2018, by Other People. The album, a collection of tracks produced by Jaar in the period between 2012 and 2017, was released with little warning, and does not feature Jaar's name on the cover or Other People's online store 

The album, seen by some as a compilation, received critical acclaim upon its release.

Critical reception

At Metacritic, which assigns a normalized rating out of 100 to reviews from mainstream publications, 2012–2017 received an average score of 82, based on 5 reviews, indicating "universal acclaim". Writing for Pitchfork, Andrew Gaerig wrote that "Jaar lets loose a surprise release of sample-heavy cuts both bolder and more refined than his early club tracks", giving the album the site's "Best New Music" designation. Clashs Matthew Cooper positively reviewed 2012–2017, describing it as "[having] an instant impact as Jaar substitutes avant-garde dystopian techno with the most off kilter time signatures for something much more predictable". Reviewing the album for AllMusic, Fred Thomas compared it to Jaar's previous work, stating "it's easily the most carefree and inviting of his work. No previous knowledge of his catalog is necessary to get happily lost in the blissful layers of 2012/2017."

Track listing
All tracks written by Nicolas Jaar.

"This Old House Is All I Have" – 3:39
"I Never Dream" – 6:46
"Some Kind of Game" – 6:47
"Hopeless" – 5:41
"Know You" – 4:25
"Such a Bad Way" – 4:53
"Cityfade" – 5:41
"Now U Got Me Hooked" – 5:51
"Flash in the Pan" – 7:28
"You Are Going to Love Me and Scream" – 5:35
"Rave on U" – 9:56

References

2018 albums
Nicolas Jaar albums